Myothit is a town of Myothit Township in Magway District in the Magway Region in Myanmar.

Populated places in Magway Region
Township capitals of Myanmar